The 4600 Class was a 4-4-2T steam locomotive built by the Great Western Railway in 1913. It was one of the GWR standard classes with two outside cylinders.

It was designed as light suburban locomotive, based on the successful 4500 class 2-6-2T engines. Compared with these, it had larger (and fewer) coupled wheels, intended to allow higher speeds with local trains. The only example built spent most of its career in the Birmingham area, and was not considered a success. The limited adhesion and restricted tank capacity meant that it did not improve on the 4500 class, and the larger 2-6-2T classes handled the suburban traffic better. It was withdrawn in 1925 and scrapped.

Notes

References

External links 
 Photograph of 4600 at Birmingham Moor Street station
 A Beginner's Guide to GWR 4-coupled tanks (includes works photo of 4600)

4-4-2T locomotives
Standard gauge steam locomotives of Great Britain
4600
Railway locomotives introduced in 1913
Scrapped locomotives
Unique locomotives